Thraupis  is a genus of  birds of the tanager family occurring from Mexico to Argentina and Brazil. Some are familiar species with large ranges. In Brazil it's called Pipira-azul (pronn: peepeeră, æzoól) when it has a tone blue color, when it has green tone color is called "Pipira-verde" or "Pipira-Vierde" on mexico.

These tanagers are mainly found in semi-open habitats including plantations and open woodland, but some will venture into towns. They feed from medium to high levels in trees, taking mainly fruit, with some nectar, and insects which may be taken in flight. The pair builds a usually well concealed cup nest, but the female incubates alone. The blue-gray and palm tanagers will nest in buildings. Thraupis tanagers have squeaky call notes and songs which consist of 5-10 repetitions of a single or double note.

Taxonomy and species list
The genus was introduced by the German naturalist Friedrich Boie in 1826 with the golden-chevroned tanager as the type species. The name of the genus is the Ancient Greek word for an unidentified small bird mentioned by Aristotle.

The genus formerly included the blue-and-yellow tanager and the blue-capped tanager. These were moved to other genera based of the results of molecular phylogenetic studies.

The genus contains seven species.

References

External links

 
Bird genera